These are the Group B Standings and Results:

Standings

Results/Fixtures

All times given below are in Central European Time.

Game 1
November 6, 2007

Game 2
November 13, 2007

Game 3
November 20, 2007

Game 4
November 27, 2007

Game 5
December 4, 2007

Game 6
December 11, 2007

Game 7
December 18, 2007

Game 8
January 8, 2008

Game 9
January 15, 2008

Game 10
January 22, 2008

External links

2007–08 ULEB Cup